Louis Weisner (born 1899–1988) was an American-Canadian mathematician at the University of New Brunswick  who introduced Weisner's method.

He graduated in 1923 from Columbia University with a Ph.D. in mathematics. His thesis Groups whose maximal cyclic subgroups are independent was supervised by Frank Nelson Cole. As a postdoc, Weisner was an instructor at the University of Rochester. At Hunter College he was appointed an instructor in 1927 and was successively promoted to assistant professor and associate professor. When he was an associate professor in 1954, the Board of Higher Education of the City of New York charged him with "neglect of duty" and "conduct unbecoming a member of the staff" because of his alleged involvement, beginning "in or about the year 1938", with the Communist Party. From 1955 to 1988 he was a professor of mathematics at the University of New Brunswick.

Selected publications

Articles

Books
  (reprint of 1938 1st edition)

References

External links 
 Louis Weisner memorial prize
 

Canadian mathematicians
1899 births
1988 deaths
American emigrants to Canada
Columbia Graduate School of Arts and Sciences alumni